Eugène Colin (6 January 1899 – 5 September 1980) was a French racing cyclist. He rode in the 1920 Tour de France.

References

1899 births
1980 deaths
French male cyclists
Place of birth missing